Obey the Law is a 1933 American Pre-Code crime drama film released by Columbia Pictures.

Plot
A good-hearted and patriotic Italian immigrant barber Tony Pasqual (Leo Carrillo) who takes pity on embittered war veteran Bob Richards (Eddie Garr). When Richards robs him, Pasqual responds by helping Richards find a job. Richards dies while trying to rescue young Dickie Chester (Dickie Moore) from illicit gambling, and Pasqual takes in Chester and his mother (Lois Wilson). Big Joe Reardon (Henry Clive) is unsuccessful in using public displays of charitable good deeds to fool Pasqual into believing that he's not the neighborhood crime boss, so he has the barber shop destroyed. Pasqual gets Reardon apprehended by the police by telling his story on radio.

Cast
Leo Carrillo – Tony Pasqual
Dickie Moore – Dickie Chester
Lois Wilson – Grace Chester
Eddie Garr – Bob Richards
Gino Corrado – Giovanni
Ward Bond – Kid Paris
Henry Clive – Big Joe Reardon

References

External links
 
 
 
 

1933 films
1933 drama films
American black-and-white films
Columbia Pictures films
American drama films
Films directed by Benjamin Stoloff
1930s English-language films
1930s American films